Donald McNeil may refer to:

 Donald McNeil (footballer) (born 1958), Scottish footballer
 Donald G. McNeil Jr. (born 1954), American journalist
 Donald C. MacNeil (1924–1978), Canadian politician